Yves Oehri (born 15 March 1987) is a Liechtensteiner international footballer who plays for FC Greifensee, as a right back.

Career
Born in Nürensdorf, Switzerland, Oehri made his senior debut in 2006 for FC Winterthur II, before moving to FC St. Gallen in 2008. He signed for FC Vaduz in 2010.

International career
Oehri made his international debut for Liechtenstein in 2006.

References

External links

1987 births
Living people
Liechtenstein footballers
Liechtenstein international footballers
Swiss men's footballers
Swiss people of Liechtenstein descent
People with acquired Liechtenstein citizenship
FC St. Gallen players
Expatriate footballers in Switzerland
Liechtenstein expatriate sportspeople in Switzerland
Liechtenstein expatriate footballers
People from Bülach District
Association football fullbacks
Sportspeople from the canton of Zürich